Vahdat (also Romanized as Vaḩdat) is a village in Shahi Rural District, Sardasht District, Andimeshk County, Khuzestan Province, Iran. At the 2006 census, its population was 224, in 41 families.

References 

Populated places in Andimeshk County